Battle of the Worlds is a 1961 Italian science fiction film directed by Anthony Dawson. The film stars Claude Rains, Bill Carter, and Maya Brent.

Plot
Dr. Fred Steele (Umberto Orsini) and Eve Barnett (Maya Brent) work together at an astronomical station on a bucolic island. Steele has just had his request for a transfer approved, and he and Eve look forward to leaving the island and getting married. However, their budding romance is quickly put on hold as the station's scientists learn they must deal with a rogue planet—"The Outsider"—that has entered the Solar System, and which is on a collision course with Earth. The brilliant but cantankerous Professor Benson (Claude Rains), living in an adjacent greenhouse with his dog Gideon, predicts that the Outsider will not strike the Earth but will simply make a close pass—a prediction that no other scientist will endorse.  Meanwhile, a military base on Mars encounters the stray planet on its approach to Earth, and Commander Robert Cole and his wife Cathy quickly travel to the island outpost from Mars to help with the effort.

The base scientists are elated when the Outsider passes the earth at a distance of 95,000 miles, just as Benson predicted. But Benson himself is stunned when the Outsider takes up an orbit round Earth. He concludes that the Outsider must be controlled by an alien intelligence, and he calls upon the world's scientific governing council to destroy it without delay.

Against Benson's wishes, an expedition is launched to make a close study of the new planet. As the exploratory spacecraft approach, a number of disc-shaped alien spaceships emerge from beneath the planet's surface, destroying the Earth vessels.

The phantom planet begins spiraling inward toward the Earth, creating hurricanes and storms, and the beginning of the end appears to be near. Professor Benson discovers that the alien ships are computer-controlled, and he devises a way to seize control of them from the Outsider. Benson is given the opportunity to join an expedition to the Outsider, to learn something of its underground base. Meanwhile, a plan is hatched to launch an all-out attack against the planet, in the hope that a massive nuclear strike will break the planet apart.

Benson's expedition discovers a race of humanoid creatures dead at the controls of their planet-spaceship, as the automated systems continue their work without purpose. But the expedition has overrun its allotted time, and the order is given to begin the attack. It is a race against time as the members of the expedition try to get back to the ship before the nuclear warheads strike. Cathy is mortally wounded in the attempt to flee the Outsider. Benson refuses to leave, insisting that life without scientific knowledge is not worth living. He sees a way to communicate with the Outsider and program it to leave, but it is too late. The warheads reach their target, and the Outsider is successfully destroyed.  As the exploratory ship returns to Earth, Commander Cole speaks Benson's epitaph: "Poor Benson—if they'd opened up his chest, they would only find a formula where his heart should have been". The screen fades out on Benson's little dog waiting for him by the window.

Cast
 Claude Rains as Professor Benson
 Bill Carter as Cmdr. Robert Cole
 Umberto Orsini as Dr. Fred Steele
 Maya Brent as Eve Barnett
 Jacqueline Derval as Mrs. Collins

Release
Battle of the Worlds was released in Italy in 1961 as Il pianeta degli uomini spenti.

Reception
From retrospective reviews, Phil Hardy's book Science Fiction referred to the film as one of Margheriti's "most humorous, inventive, stylish, films, effortlessly transcending the crudities of the script, acting and special effects."

References

Citations

Bibliography

External links
 
 

1960s science fiction films
1961 films
Films directed by Antonio Margheriti
1960s Italian-language films
English-language Italian films
Italian science fiction films
Rogue planets in fiction
Space adventure films
1960s Italian films